Rodeo Massacre is the sixth album released by French post-rock band Ulan Bator.

Track listing
"Fly.Candy Dragon.Fly!"  – 4:16
"God: Dog"  – 5:28
"Pensees Massacre"  – 3:02
"Tom Passion"  – 4:12
"Torture"  – 6:58
"La Femme Cannibale"  – 4:14
"33"  – 4:12
"Instinct"  – 5:03
"Souvenir"  – 5:43

2005 albums
Ulan Bator (band) albums